Lee Sheldon may refer to:

 Lee Sheldon (writer), game developer and writer
 Stagger Lee Sheldon, American murderer